István Busa (born 31 May 1961) is a Hungarian fencer. He won a bronze medal in the team foil event at the 1988 Summer Olympics.

References

External links
 

1961 births
Living people
Hungarian male foil fencers
Olympic fencers of Hungary
Fencers at the 1988 Summer Olympics
Fencers at the 1992 Summer Olympics
Olympic bronze medalists for Hungary
Olympic medalists in fencing
People from Kecskemét
Medalists at the 1988 Summer Olympics
Sportspeople from Bács-Kiskun County